Arthur George William Sparrow (1896–1967) was a notable New Zealand commercial artist, photographer and businessman. He was born in Dunedin, New Zealand in 1896.

References

1896 births
1967 deaths
Artists from Dunedin
New Zealand photographers
Businesspeople from Dunedin